Mahesh Jadu (born 26 October 1982) is an Australian actor of Indo-Mauritian ancestry. He is best known for the role of Dr. Doug Harris in the soap opera Neighbours and the role of Ahmad in Netflix original series Marco Polo. He also portrayed the supporting role of Shanmugum in the miniseries Better Man and Vilgefortz in The Witcher.

Early life
Mahesh Jadu was born in Carlton, Victoria, Australia. His parents are from Mauritius and his Indo Mauritian ancestry originates from Bihar, Gorakhpur and Kashmir.

Career
He started off as a composer for an Australian show, Byte Me. He auditioned for a small role in an Indian film, Sorry Bhai! and was subsequently cast. He was later cast in one of Australia's longest running soaps, Neighbours as Doug Harris. He played poker to cover rent and living expenses until he was called for an audition by the casting director, Lou Mitchell.

In 2011, he was cast in an Australian drama, Taj, which was presented at the 16th Busan International Film Festival.

He then worked on The Three Ages of Sasha. He got his big break when he was cast in Roland Joffé's periodic drama, Singularity, which was later renamed The Lovers. In 2015, he was cast in Netflix's Marco Polo as Ahmad Fanakati. and had a role in I, Frankenstein. In 2019 he played Vilgefortz of Roggeveen in the Netflix's TV series The Witcher.

Filmography

References

External links
 
 

1982 births
Living people
Australian male film actors
Australian male television actors
Australian people of Indian descent
21st-century Australian male actors
Australian people of Mauritian descent
Australian people of Kashmiri descent
Male actors from Melbourne